Agureyev (masculine) or Agureyeva (feminine) is a Russian last name. Variants of this last name include Agureykin/Agureykina (/), Ogureyev/Ogureyeva (/), Ogurenkov/Ogurenkova (/), Oguryayev/Oguryayeva (/), and possibly Ogurtsov/Ogurtsova (/).

There are three theories as to the origins of these last names. According to the first one, they derive from the Russian dialectal verb ""—or "" (aguret) in dialects with akanye—meaning to disobey. This and related dialectal words "" (ogur), meaning stubbornness, laziness; "", meaning a stubborn idler, a slacker; and "" (oguryatsya), meaning to slack off, gave birth to nicknames "" (Ogurey) and "" (Oguryay), as well as "" (Agurey) and "" (Agureyka) in dialects with akanye.

According to another theory, this last name derives from the first name Gury, a form of which is "Gurey". The latter eventually transformed to "Agureyev"/"Ogureyev", as adding a vowel made pronunciation easier.

Finally, it is also possible that these last names (and especially "Ogurtsov") derive from the nickname "" (Ogurets), which in some dialects has the same meaning as "Ogurey" and its variants above, but also literally means cucumber. The latter possibility, however, is discounted by some researchers.

People 
Polina Agureyeva, Russian actress starring in Euphoria, a 2006 drama/romance movie, and Liquidation, a 2007 miniseries

References

Notes

Sources
И. М. Ганжина (I. M. Ganzhina). "Словарь современных русских фамилий" (Dictionary of Modern Russian Last Names). Москва, 2001. 
В. А. Никонов (V. A. Nikonov). "Словарь русских фамилий" (Dictionary of the Russian Last Names). Москва, 1993. .
Ю. А. Федосюк (Yu. A. Fedosyuk). "Русские фамилии: популярный этимологический словарь" (Russian Last Names: a Popular Etymological Dictionary). Москва, 2006. 



Russian-language surnames